Lionel Donato (born 17 June 1964) is a Swiss former professional footballer who  played as a centre-back.

External links
Lionel Donato profile at chamoisfc79.fr

1964 births
Living people
Swiss men's footballers
Association football defenders
Chamois Niortais F.C. players
Louhans-Cuiseaux FC players
Bourges 18 players
Ligue 2 players
People from Zug
Sportspeople from the canton of Zug